Thymosin beta-4, Y-chromosomal is a protein that in humans is encoded by the TMSB4Y gene.

The protein consists (in humans) of 44 amino acids (msdkpgmaei ekfdksklkk tetqeknpls sketieqerq ages) MolWt 4881.

Function 

This gene lies within the male specific region of chromosome Y. Its homolog on chromosome X (thymosin beta-4) escapes X inactivation and encodes an actin sequestering protein.

References

Further reading